Himley is a civil parish in the district of South Staffordshire, Staffordshire, England.  It contains twelve listed buildings that are recorded in the National Heritage List for England.  Of these, one is at Grade II*, the middle of the three grades, and the others are at Grade II, the lowest grade.  The most important building in the parish is Himley Hall, a country house, which is listed together with associated structures and items in the grounds, Himley Park.  The other listed buildings include a former rectory and associated structures, houses, a church, a hotel, a public house, and an ice house.


Key

Buildings

References

Citations

Sources

Lists of listed buildings in Staffordshire
South Staffordshire District